Maharani Khera is a village in Hilauli block of Unnao district, Uttar Pradesh, India. As of 2011, its population is 2,683, in 502 households, and it has one primary school and no healthcare facilities.

The 1961 census recorded Maharani Khera (here spelled "Mahrani Khera") as comprising 6 hamlets, with a total population of 942 (511 male and 431 female), in 210 households and 180 physical houses. The area of the village was given as 1,218 acres.

References

Villages in Unnao district